Stephen Strange is a fictional character portrayed by Benedict Cumberbatch in the Marvel Cinematic Universe (MCU) media franchise—based on the Marvel Comics character of the same name—commonly known by his academic title and alias—Doctor Strange. Initially depicted as a brilliant but arrogant neurosurgeon, Strange experiences a career-ending car accident and in his search to repair his damaged hands, he discovers magic from Kamar-Taj. He becomes a Master of the Mystic Arts, using his newfound powers to protect the Earth from various threats. In the process, he allies with the Avengers and Guardians of the Galaxy to combat Thanos, before allowing Thanos to initiate the Blip, himself among its victims, to ensure their ultimate victory five years later upon being restored to life. On his return, Strange remains the appointed Guardian of the New York Sanctum, but finds that Wong has become Sorcerer Supreme, a position Strange himself was in the process of inheriting from the Ancient One prior to being Blipped. Strange later faces several problems from the newly-established multiverse, including a rift between realities created by an interrupted attempt to erase everyone's knowledge of Peter Parker's secret identity as Spider-Man; and a Darkhold-corrupted Wanda Maximoff, whom he must stop from acquiring America Chavez's ability to traverse the multiverse for her own goals.

As of 2022, the character is one of the central figures of the MCU, having appeared in six films. Cumberbatch has received acclaim for his performance as Strange and was nominated for several awards.

Alternate versions of Strange from the multiverse appear in the animated series What If...? (2021) and the film Doctor Strange in the Multiverse of Madness (2022). A notable version in What If...? is Doctor Strange Supreme, who accidentally destroys his universe in his efforts to resurrect his version of Christine Palmer, and later co-founds the Guardians of the Multiverse with the Watcher to defeat an alternate version of Ultron.

Concept and creation 
The character of Doctor Strange was originally created in the 1960s. Artist Steve Ditko and writer Stan Lee have described the character as having been originally the idea of Ditko, who wrote in 2008, "On my own, I brought in to Lee a five-page, penciled story with a page/panel script of my idea of a new, different kind of character for variety in Marvel Comics. My character wound up being named Dr. Strange because he would appear in Strange Tales." In a 1963 letter to Jerry Bails, Lee wrote:

Following a 1978 film adaptation also titled Dr. Strange, various incarnations of a Doctor Strange film adaptation had been in development since the mid-1980s, until Paramount Pictures acquired the film rights in April 2005 on behalf of Marvel Studios. In the mid-2000s, Kevin Feige had realized that Marvel still owned the rights to the core characters of the Avengers, which included Strange. Feige, a self-professed "fanboy", envisioned creating a shared universe just as creators Stan Lee and Jack Kirby had done with their comic books in the early 1960s. In 2004, David Maisel was hired as chief operating officer of Marvel Studios as he had a plan for the studio to self-finance movies. Marvel entered into a non-recourse debt structure with Merrill Lynch, under which Marvel got $525 million to make a maximum of 10 movies based on the company's properties over eight years, collateralized by certain movie rights to a total of 10 characters, including Doctor Strange. Thomas Dean Donnelly and Joshua Oppenheimer were brought on board in June 2010 to write a screenplay. In June 2014, Derrickson was hired to direct and re-write the film with Spaihts. Cumberbatch was chosen for the eponymous role in December 2014, necessitating a schedule change to work around his other commitments. This gave Derrickson time to work on the script himself, for which he brought Cargill on to help. The film began principal photography in November 2015 in Nepal, before moving to the United Kingdom and Hong Kong, and concluding in New York City in April 2016.

Characterization 
In his first feature-length appearance in the MCU, Dr. Strange is a neurosurgeon who, after a car crash that led to a journey of healing, discovers the hidden world of magic and alternate dimensions. Cumberbatch described Strange as arrogant, with the film "about him going from a place where he thinks he knows it all to realizing he knows nothing." He compared the character to the version of Sherlock Holmes that he portrays in Sherlock, calling both characters "intelligent" and having "smatterings of the same colors". The film's mysticism resonated with Cumberbatch, for whom spirituality has been important since he spent his gap year teaching English at a Tibetan Buddhist monastery in Darjeeling, India. Strange's abilities in the film include casting spells with "tongue-twisty fun names", creating mandalas of light for shields and weapons, and creating portals for quick travel around the world. Strange is also aided by a Cloak of Levitation for flight, and the Eye of Agamotto, a relic containing an Infinity Stone that can manipulate time. Cumberbatch took great care in defining the physical movements and gestures for the spells, knowing that they would be noted and studied by fans. He described these gestures as "balletic" and "very dynamic", and received help with finger-tutting movements from dancer JayFunk.

Later, Strange has become a Master of the Mystic Arts. Markus and McFeely described Strange in Infinity War as "[ending] up being the reasonable adult in the room" with the "widest perspective available". Aaron Lazar served as Cumberbatch's stand-in until the latter completed filming on The Current War (2017). At that point, Cumberbatch re-shot scenes where his face needed to be seen. Julian "JayFunk" Daniels once again assisted Cumberbatch with his finger-tutting movements.

In Doctor Strange in the Multiverse of Madness, writer Michael Waldron compared Strange to Indiana Jones as a hero who can "take a punch", but with the intellect of chef Anthony Bourdain, and added that he is a "great adventure hero you just like to watch kick ass". Waldron hoped to explore what effect the events Strange has gone through in his previous MCU appearances would have on him. Cumberbatch also portrays three alternate versions of the character: a seemingly heroic incarnation based on the version of the character from the 2011 Defenders comic book series; the former Sorcerer Supreme of Earth-838 who founded the Illuminati; and a version who has been corrupted by the Darkhold.

Appearances

Film
Benedict Cumberbatch portrays Stephen Strange in the films Doctor Strange (2016), Thor: Ragnarok (2017), Avengers: Infinity War (2018), Avengers: Endgame (2019), Spider-Man: No Way Home (2021), and Doctor Strange in the Multiverse of Madness (2022), where he also plays three alternate versions of the character.

Animation
Cumberbatch voices an alternate version of Strange called Doctor Strange Supreme in three episodes of the Disney+ series What If...? (2021): "What If... Doctor Strange Lost His Heart Instead of His Hands?", "What If... Ultron Won?", and "What If... the Watcher Broke His Oath?", as well as a zombie Strange in "What If... Zombies?!". An alternate version of the character will appear in the Disney+ series Spider-Man: Freshman Year (2024).

Fictional character biography

Early life 
As a child, Stephen Strange plays on a frozen pond with his sister, Donna, who falls through the ice and drowns, causing Strange to lament his inability to save her. He becomes a doctor, and through years of study and practice, hones his skills to a high level.

Becoming a Master of the Mystic Arts 

In 2016, Strange is a wealthy, acclaimed but arrogant neurosurgeon, who severely injures his hands in a car crash while en route to a dinner, leaving him unable to operate. Fellow surgeon and former lover Christine Palmer tries to help him move on, but Strange ignores her attempts and vainly pursues experimental surgeries to heal his hands, at the cost of his wealth. Strange learns about Jonathan Pangborn, a paraplegic, who he had refused to treat earlier due to perceiving him having little chance of recovery but had mysteriously regained use of his legs. Pangborn directs Strange to Kamar-Taj, where he is rescued from a band of thieves attempting to steal an expensive watch of his and taken in by Mordo, a sorcerer under the Ancient One.

The Ancient One demonstrates her power to Strange, revealing the astral plane and other dimensions such as the Mirror Dimension. She reluctantly agrees to train Strange, whose arrogance and ambition remind her of renegade sorcerer Kaecilius, who had recently stolen pages out of a vital book from the Kamar-Taj library. Strange studies under the Ancient One and Mordo, and from ancient books in the library that is now guarded by Master Wong. Strange learns that Earth is protected from threats from other dimensions by a shield generated from three buildings called Sanctums, in New York City, London, and Hong Kong, which are all connected and accessible from Kamar-Taj. Strange uses his impressive memory and progresses quickly, secretly reading the text from which Kaecilius stole pages, learning to bend time with the mystical Eye of Agamotto. Mordo and Wong catch Strange in the act and warn him against breaking the laws of nature, drawing a comparison to Kaecilius' desire for eternal life. After Kaecilius uses the stolen pages to contact Dormammu of the Dark Dimension and leads an attack on the New York Sanctum, killing its guardian, Strange holds off the attackers with the help of the Cloak of Levitation until Mordo and the Ancient One arrive. Mordo becomes disillusioned with the Ancient One after Strange reveals that the Ancient One has been drawing power from the Dark Dimension to sustain her long life. Kaecilius later mortally wounds the Ancient One and escapes to Hong Kong. Before dying, she tells Strange that he too will have to bend the rules to complement Mordo's steadfast nature to defeat Kaecilius, in addition to making him choose between healing like Pangborn or serving protecting the Earth. Strange and Mordo arrive in Hong Kong to find Wong dead, the Sanctum destroyed, and the Dark Dimension engulfing Earth. Strange uses the Eye to reverse time and save Wong, then enters the Dark Dimension and creates a time loop around himself and Dormammu. After repeatedly killing Strange to no avail, Dormammu finally gives in to Strange's demand that he leave Earth and take Kaecilius and his zealots with him in return for Strange breaking the loop. Strange returns the Eye to Kamar-Taj, and takes up residence in the New York Sanctum to continue his studies and keeps a watchlist of various threats to Earth.

In 2017, when Thor and Loki arrive in New York, Strange traps Loki in a portal and invites Thor to the New York Sanctum, where he questions his motives for bringing Loki to Earth. Thor explains they are searching for their father, so Strange locates Odin, releases Loki, and sends the two into a portal to Norway.

Infinity War and resurrection 

In 2018, Strange and Wong are talking in the New York Sanctum when Bruce Banner crash-lands through the roof. He informs Strange and Wong of the imminent threat of Thanos. In response, Strange recruits Tony Stark to help. Ebony Maw and Cull Obsidian, members of the Children of Thanos, arrive to retrieve the Time Stone kept by Strange in the Eye of Agamotto, and end up drawing the attention of Peter Parker, who arrives to help. Maw captures Strange, but fails to take the Time Stone due to an enchantment, so he takes him to his spaceship to be tortured until he breaks the spell. However, Stark and Parker infiltrate the ship, kill Maw, and rescue Strange. Landing on the planet Titan, where Maw is supposed to meet with Thanos, the trio meet Peter Quill, Drax the Destroyer, and Mantis and together form a plan to combat Thanos once he arrives. While waiting for him, Strange uses the Time Stone to view millions of possible futures, seeing only one in which Thanos loses. The group, along with Nebula, fight Thanos and are nearly successful in removing his Infinity Gauntlet with the Infinity Stones, until an enraged Quill unintentionally breaks their hold on him. After a brief duel with Thanos, Strange is defeated while Stark is severely wounded, but is spared when Strange surrenders the Time Stone. Once the Blip occurs, Strange tells Stark there was no other way and disintegrates.

In 2023, Strange is restored to life and he along with Wong and the other Masters of the Mystic Arts transport Parker, the restored Avengers, the Guardians of the Galaxy, the Wakandans, the Asgardians, and the Ravagers via portals to the destroyed Avengers Compound to join the final battle against an alternate Thanos and his army. During the battle, Strange keeps the battlefield from being flooded by the lake and hints to Stark that this is the one future in which they win. After Stark sacrifices himself to defeat alternate Thanos, Strange attends his funeral.

Helping Peter Parker 

In 2024, Wong has assumed the title of Sorcerer Supreme, much to Strange's disappointment, as he believes that he was set to obtain the position before the Blip. After Parker's identity as Spider-Man is exposed to the world by Quentin Beck, Parker visits and enlists the help of Strange in casting the spell called the Runes of Kof-Kol to make the world forget he is Spider-Man, to which he agrees despite Wong's warnings of the spell's danger.  The spell backfires when Parker inadvertently distracts Strange by talking while he is performing it and changing the parameters multiple times, tampering with and breaking open the multiverse, causing people from other realities who know that Parker is Spider-Man to enter Strange's universe, including two alternate versions of Parker (one from The Amazing Spider-Man film series, and the other from the Sam Raimi film series), as well as their adversaries Otto Octavius, Norman Osborn, Flint Marko, Curt Connors, and Max Dillon, and, unbeknownst to both Strange and Parker, Eddie Brock and his Symbiote companion Venom (from Sony's Spider-Man Universe). After tasking Parker and his friends to retrieve the visitors, an annoyed and weary Strange attempts to send the villains back to their home universes using a relic: The Macchina de Kadavus, but after learning that some of them will die once they return and intending to cure them before sending them back, Parker steals Strange's spell-containing relic and Strange pursues him into the Mirror Dimension where they briefly duel. Strange becomes trapped in the Mirror Dimension for twelve hours when he is caught off guard and Parker steals his sling ring. He is later inadvertently released by Parker's friend Ned Leeds (who had Strange's sling ring with him) and witnesses Parker and his alternate versions curing the villains. Strange's relic is destroyed by Osborn, resulting in the multiverse continuing to break open. Parker tells Strange to reattempt the spell, this time having the world forget about his existence altogether instead. Strange, although initially reluctant and warning Parker of the cost, agrees and casts the spell, resulting in the alternate Parkers, their villains, Brock and Venom returning to their home universes while everyone from Strange's universe forgets Parker including himself (but still remember Spider-Man as a hero).

Fighting the Scarlet Witch 

Sometime later, as Strange attends Christine Palmer's wedding, where he apologizes to her for his past conduct, an invisible creature suddenly attacks the city and is confronted by Strange, who reveals the creature as an interdimensional octopus-like being, Gargantos. When Strange is overpowered, Wong joins the fight and the two eventually kill it while saving a girl, who introduces herself as America Chavez. Chavez explains she can travel through the multiverse and that other creatures are after her power including a Stephen Strange from another universe. Chavez takes Strange and Wong to Strange's body and Strange deduces that he was attacked with witchcraft.

Strange meets with Wanda Maximoff, not realizing that she has already been taken over by the  Darkhold and converted into the Scarlet Witch. After Strange tells Maximoff about Chavez, she intends on using Chavez to take her power to be with alternate real versions of her children Billy and Tommy that she created during her time in Westview. Strange attempts to reason with her that they are not real but refuses to give her to Maximoff, who attacks Kamar-Taj, killing many sorcerers. During the attack, Chavez's powers are triggered and she and Strange escape in a portal, while Wong is imprisoned by Maximoff. Maximoff begins to conduct a Darkhold spell known as "dream walking", to find a version of herself with Billy and Tommy across the multiverse and take over her body, but after a sorceress sacrifice to destroy the Darkhold and break the dream-walk, she forces Wong to lead her to Mount Wundagore, the source of the Darkholds power and the location of a shrine to the Scarlet Witch, allowing her to reestablish the dream-walk with her Earth-838 self.

Strange and Chavez end up in an alternate universe, designated as "Earth-838", where they are arrested by this universe's Mordo. Strange meets this universe's Palmer who designates his Earth as "Earth-616". Mordo takes Strange to the Illuminati, consisting of Mordo himself, Captain Peggy Carter, King Blackagar Boltagon, Captain Maria Rambeau, Dr. Reed Richards, and Professor Charles Xavier. They explain how their Strange's reckless use of their universe's Darkhold to defeat their Thanos trigged an "incursion", destroying another universe, which led the Illuminati to kill him, making Mordo the new Sorcerer Supreme and taking Strange's vacant spot on the Illuminati. The Illuminati then claim that Strange-616 is also dangerous and refuse to believe his warnings about Scarlet Witch. Wanda-616 dream walks into Wanda-838 to capture Chavez and attacks the Illuminati headquarters, killing all of them except for Mordo, who is defeated by Strange. Strange, Chavez, and Palmer escape to the space between universes where they go after the Book of Vishanti, which they intend to use to defeat the Scarlet Witch. Maximoff appears and takes over Chavez's mind, using her powers to send Strange and Palmer to another universe. On Earth-616, Maximoff begins the spell to take Chavez's powers.

Strange and Palmer enter an incursion-destroyed universe where Strange meets yet another Strange, who was corrupted by the Darkhold. Strange kills this universe's Strange and takes his Darkhold to dream walk into Defender Strange's deceased body and go after Maximoff. With help from Wong and Chavez, who managed to gain control over her powers, they transport Maximoff back to "Earth-838" and that universe's Maximoff household, where she is freed from the Darkhold's control by frightening that universe's Billy and Tommy in front of their mother. Realizing what she has done, Maximoff destroys the Darkhold in all the universes, apparently sacrificing herself to do so by using her powers to bring down Mount Wundagore. Strange, Chavez, and Wong return to Earth-616 as Palmer-838 returns to her home. Chavez begins training at Kamar-Taj. In the aftermath, Strange develops a third eye and is approached by a sorceress who invites him to avert an incursion in the Dark Dimension.

 Alternate versions 

Several alternate versions of Strange appear in the animated series What If...? and the film Doctor Strange in the Multiverse of Madness, all played by Cumberbatch.

 What If…? 
 Doctor Strange Supreme 

In an alternate 2016, Strange seeks out Kamar-Taj and becomes a Master of the Mystic Arts after Palmer dies in a car crash while he was left uninjured. After being appointed the title of Sorcerer Supreme, the newly-dubbed Doctor Strange Supreme''' then makes countless attempts to reverse Palmer's death using the Eye of Agamotto, but fails no matter what he tries and is informed by the Ancient One that the event was an irreversible "absolute point" in time, as the resulting paradox would damage the fabric of reality. Strange refuses to listen and flees to the Library of Cagliostro, where he spends centuries absorbing magical beings and becoming a monstrous version of his former self. Learning that the Ancient One used a spell from the Dark Dimension to splinter him into two beings to divide his power, with the other half having come to terms with Palmer's death, Strange Supreme confronts his other half and eventually absorbs him before resurrecting Palmer, who is repulsed by his appearance while their universe unravels. Strange Supreme begs aid from the Watcher, an omniscient observer of the Multiverse, only to be refused as the Watcher condemns him for not heeding the Ancient One's warning and that he vowed not to interfere in the Multiverse's events. As his universe collapses, Strange Supreme helplessly watches as Palmer fades away from existence and he grieves alone in a pocket dimension.

Sometime later, Strange Supreme is visited by the Watcher, who seeks his help in defeating another universe's Ultron. Strange materializes a bar and meets Captain Carter, Star-Lord T'Challa, Thor, Gamora, and Erik "Killmonger" Stevens, who had been chosen by the Watcher as the Guardians of the Multiverse to combat Ultron. While in another universe, Thor prematurely alerts Ultron to their location, prompting Strange to transport a horde of zombies from another universe to distract Ultron as they escaped. In Ultron's home universe, they meet Natasha Romanoff, and the team battle Ultron. After Romanoff and Carter successfully upload Arnim Zola's analog consciousness into Ultron's body, Killmonger betrays them and is trapped by Strange in a pocket dimension with Zola. Strange Supreme is then tasked by the Watcher to watch them for eternity, in which he gladly accepts while quoting to the Watcher "What are friends for?".

 Zombie Strange 

In an alternate 2018, Strange becomes infected with a quantum virus and is transformed into a zombie. After attacking Bruce Banner outside of the New York Sanctum, he is killed by Hope van Dyne. The Cloak of Levitation rejected him when he became a zombie, attaching itself to Peter Parker and later to the jar holding Scott Lang's head.

 Multiverse of Madness 

 Defender Strange 
In an alternate reality known as Earth-617, Strange protects America Chavez from an interdimensional demon who is attempting to steal her ability to enter the multiverse. Unable to escape, and believing himself better equipped to control her powers, Strange tries to steal them. He is mortally wounded by the demon, and Chavez sends both of them to Earth-616 (the main reality in the MCU), where he dies of his wounds. Earth-616 Strange and Wong find and hide the body. His body is later possessed by 616-Strange using the "dream-walking" spell from the Darkhold to fight Wanda Maximoff.

 Earth-838's Supreme Strange 
In an alternate reality known as Earth-838, Strange is a member of the Illuminati. However, his reckless misuse of the Darkhold in his effort to defeat Thanos creates an "incursion" which destroyed another universe. He was executed by Black Bolt, making Karl Mordo the new Sorcerer Supreme of Earth-838. Upon his demise, the Illuminati lied to the world by telling them that Strange sacrificed himself to kill Thanos, and a statue was erected in his honor at the New York Sanctum, bestowing him the title of "Earth's Mightiest Hero".

 Darkhold-corrupted Sinister Strange 
In an alternate reality, Strange used the Darkhold to dreamwalk and find other versions of himself who might be happily living with their Christine Palmer. When he could not find such a version, he set out to kill other versions of himself, nearly decimating his own universe in the process. When 616-Strange and 838-Palmer enter this universe, 616-Strange fights and ultimately kills the corrupted Strange.

 Reception The Hollywood Reporters Todd McCarthy called Doctor Strange "smartly cast", while Alonso Duralde, reviewing for TheWrap said that the film was "smart enough to bring in great British actors to make the predictable paces and life lessons feel fresh and fascinating". Mara Reinstein of US Weekly criticized the film but praised Cumberbatch's "alluring powers" in the role, while Adam Graham of The Detroit News said, "Cumberbatch is wildly charismatic in the lead role... But that's the thing: He's a better party guest than he is a host. Doctor Strange'' is a fine introduction, but by the end, you're not sad to be headed for the door".

Accolades

See also 
 Characters of the Marvel Cinematic Universe
 Multiverse (Marvel Cinematic Universe)

References

External links 
 Stephen Strange on the Marvel Cinematic Universe Wiki
 Doctor Strange Supreme on the Marvel Cinematic Universe Wiki
 
 Stephen Strange on Marvel.com

Avengers (film series)
Doctor Strange (film series)
Fictional characters displaced in time
Fictional characters from Manhattan
Fictional characters who can manipulate time
Fictional characters with dimensional travel abilities
Fictional characters with eidetic memory
Fictional characters with neurotrauma
Fictional characters with spirit possession or body swapping abilities
Fictional illusionists
Fictional neurosurgeons
Fictional people from the 21st-century
Fictional wizards
Film characters introduced in 2016
Male characters in film
Marvel Cinematic Universe characters
Marvel Comics American superheroes
Marvel Comics characters who can teleport
Marvel Comics characters who use magic
Marvel Comics male superheroes